Route 918, or Highway 918, may refer to:

Canada
Saskatchewan Highway 918

Costa Rica
 National Route 918

Israel
 Israel Route 918

United Kingdom
 A918 road

United States